Ohio's 19th congressional district was created following the 1830 census and was eliminated after the 2000 census. Between 1863 and 1880, it was represented by future US President James A. Garfield, who became the only sitting House member ever to be elected to the Presidency.

From 1992–2002 it included all of Lake County and Ashtabula County together with a collection of eastern suburbs of Cleveland. After 2002 it was replaced by the 14th district. Parts of its old territory were redistricted into the 10th, 11th, and 13th districts.

List of members representing the district

Election results
The following chart shows historic election results. Bold type indicates victor. Italic type indicates incumbent.

References

 Congressional Biographical Directory of the United States 1774–present

19
Former congressional districts of the United States
Constituencies established in 1833
1833 establishments in Ohio
Constituencies disestablished in 2003
2003 disestablishments in Ohio